The Breakthrough Experience was the fifth concert tour by American recording artist Mary J. Blige in 2006, the tour supports her multi-platinum seventh studio album, The Breakthrough (2005). Blige performed four initial dates which kicked off on June 24, in Chicago, Illinois at the Bridgeview Stadium. The official tour began in July 2006 and continued through September 2006, visiting over 30 cities across North America.

Opening acts
Letoya Luckett
Jaheim

Set list

 "Breakthrough" / "Black Ice Poem" (intro)
 "MJB Da MVP"
 "Real Love" / "Reminisce"
 "Enough Cryin" 
 "About You"
 "Be Happy" / "You Bring Me Joy" / "Mary Jane (All Night Long)"
 "Baggage"
 "Good Woman Down"
 "Can't Hide From Luv" 
 "Take Me As I Am"
 "Everything"
 "Share My World" (Reprise)
 "My Life '06"
 "Alone" (with Dave Young)
 "Seven Days"
 "I'm Going Down" 
 "Father In You" (contains elements of "Black Ice Poem")
 "I Found My Everything"
 "No More Drama"
 "One"
 "Be Without You"
 "MJB Da MVP" (reprise)
Encore
 "Touch It" (remix)
 "Family Affair"

Tour dates

References

Mary J. Blige concert tours
2006 concert tours